The Evangelist is a 1916 American silent drama film directed by Barry O'Neil based on the play by Henry Arthur Jones. It stars Gladys Hanson and Walter Law.

Cast

Production
The film was produced by the Lubin Manufacturing Company and distributed by the General Film Company in the United States on January 17, 1916.

Preservation
The film is considered a lost film by the National Film Preservation Board (NFPB) as of January 2021.

References

External links

American silent films
Lost American films
1916 lost films
Films directed by Barry O'Neil
1910s American films